Giuliano Figueras (born 24 January 1976 in Naples) is an Italian former professional road bicycle racer. He turned professional in 1998 with Mapei team and won a stage of the Tour de Langkawi that year. In 1999 and 2000 Figueras  had 7 wins including a stage of the Giro di Romandia. He rode for the Panaria–Fiordo team for 4 years and had one win each year. In 2005 Figueras switched to the new Lampre–Caffita team. Figueras has in total 14 professional wins.

Major results

1995
 2nd Gran Premio di Poggiana
1996
 1st  Road race, UCI Road World Under-23 Championships
 1st Overall Giro delle Regioni
1st Prologue (TTT)
 1st Trofeo Zsšdi
 1st 
 3rd Trofeo Piva
1997
 1st Trofeo Gianfranco Bianchin
 1st Stage 2 Girobio
 1st Stage 2b Giro della Valle d'Aosta
 9th Overall GP Tell
1st Stage 5
 9th Gran Premio della Liberazione
1998
 2nd Overall Tour de Langkawi
1st Stage 11
 7th Giro del Veneto
 10th Overall Tour of Galicia
 10th Tour de Berne
1999
 1st Stage 1 Tour de Romandie
 1st GP Rik Van Steenbergen
 3rd Clásica de San Sebastián
 3rd Trofeo Pantalica
 5th Trofeo Laigueglia
 5th Coppa Placci
 7th Overall Setmana Catalana de Ciclisme
1st Stage 4
 7th Paris–Brussels
 7th Giro della Provincia di Siracusa
 9th Overall Tour de la Region Wallonne
1st Stages 2 & 5
2000
 1st Gran Premio di Chiasso
 5th Overall Tour Méditerranéen
 8th Overall Settimana Internazionale di Coppi e Bartali
2001
 1st Giro del Veneto
 2nd Giro di Lombardia
 4th GP Industria & Artigianato di Larciano
 5th Overall Settimana Internazionale di Coppi e Bartali
 5th Giro dell'Appennino
 5th Trofeo Matteotti
 6th Giro di Campania
 7th Road race, UCI Road World Championships
 7th Trofeo Pantalica
 10th Overall Giro d'Italia
 10th Overall Giro del Trentino
2002
 1st Giro dell'Appennino
 2nd GP Industria & Artigianato di Larciano
 3rd Trofeo Pantalica
 7th Overall Giro della Liguria
 7th Trofeo Laigueglia
2003
 1st Gran Premio di Chiasso
 3rd Trofeo Pantalica
2004
 1st Overall Settimana Internazionale di Coppi e Bartali
 2nd Giro dell'Appennino
 4th Overall Giro del Trentino
 7th Overall Tour Down Under
 8th Overall Tirreno–Adriatico
 8th Giro di Toscana
2005
 2nd Trofeo Città di Castelfidardo
 2nd Gran Premio di Chiasso
 10th Tour du Haut Var
2006
 1st Giro del Lazio
 1st Stage 3 Brixia Tour
 2nd Giro di Toscana
 4th Tre Valli Varesine
 5th GP Fred Mengoni
 7th Memorial Marco Pantani
 8th Vattenfall Cyclassics
 8th Trofeo Laigueglia
 9th Overall Vuelta a Murcia

Grand Tour general classification results timeline

References

External links

Italian male cyclists
Living people
1976 births
Sportspeople from Naples
Cyclists from Campania
21st-century Italian people